Barsamian (Barsamyan) or Parsamian (Parsamyan) is an Armenian surname.

The surname originates from the Armenian male name Parsam, which is derived either from the Greek name Partan - "worm repository" or (according to Hrachya Acharyan) from the Assyrian name Barsauma - "fasting".

Notable people with the surname

Antony Barsamian, Armenian Assembly of America Board of Directors Chairman
David Barsamian, American radio broadcaster and writer
Khajag Barsamian, Diocese of Armenian Church of America Primate and the Fund for Armenian Relief president.

See also
Barsam
Barsamin

References

Armenian-language surnames